Mid Londonderry may refer to:

The central part of County Londonderry
Mid Londonderry (Northern Ireland Parliament constituency)